The plain sunbird (Anthreptes simplex) is a species of bird in the family Nectariniidae.
It is found in Brunei, Indonesia, Malaysia, Myanmar, Singapore, and Thailand.
Its natural habitats are subtropical or tropical moist lowland forests and subtropical or tropical mangrove forests.

References

plain sunbird
Birds of Malesia
plain sunbird
Taxonomy articles created by Polbot